Tshering Dendup (born 4 April 1994) is a Bhutanese international footballer, currently playing for Yeedzin. He made his first appearance for the Bhutan national football team in 2009.

References

Bhutanese footballers
Bhutan international footballers
Yeedzin F.C. players
Living people
1994 births
Association football goalkeepers